The Knockout is a 1923 British silent sports film directed by Alexander Butler and starring Lillian Hall-Davis, Rex Davis and Josephine Earle.

Cast
 Lillian Hall-Davis as Polly Peach 
 Rex Davis as Billy Berks 
 Josephine Earle as Lady Clare 
 Tom Reynolds as Manager 
 Julian Royce as Guy Ballinger 
 Mickey Brantford as Scout

References

Bibliography
 Low, Rachael. History of the British Film, 1918-1929. George Allen & Unwin, 1971.

External links

1923 films
1920s sports films
British silent feature films
1920s English-language films
Films directed by Alexander Butler
British boxing films
British black-and-white films
1920s British films